Schistura reticulata is a species of ray-finned fish, a stone loach in the genus Schistura. It is found in three hill streams in the Chindwin drainage basin on Manipur. In some areas, such as the Lokchao River at Moreh the populations of this species are severely threatened by development and border trade while in other areas it is threatened by destructive fishing techniques using poison and explosives.

References

R
Taxa named by Waikhom Vishwanath
Taxa named by Kongbrailatpan Nebeshwar Sharma
Fish described in 2004